The Greenwood Museum at the 19th century Upperville Meeting House was created by artist Terrance Lindall in the 1980s.  The Quaker meeting house was flanked by a park, a rectory and overlooked a waterfall on Pleasant Brook alongside Quaker Hill Road. Lindall gave the meeting house back to the Quakers of Hamilton, New York, to devote his energies to helping build one of New York City's newest museums, the  Williamsburg Art & Historical Center.

Further reading
The Evening Sun, Norwich, Oct. 6, 1988, "Greenwood Museum Opens"
The Evening Sun, Norwich, Oct. 9, 1991, "Quilts, Quilts, Quilts"
The Evening Sun, Norwich, Aug. 21, 1992, "Celebrating 500 Years Since Columbus — The Gothic Chapel"

Defunct museums in New York (state)